The Kramers–Wannier duality is a symmetry in statistical physics.  It relates the free energy of a two-dimensional square-lattice Ising model at a low temperature to that of another Ising model at a high temperature.  It was discovered by Hendrik Kramers and Gregory Wannier in 1941.  With the aid of this duality Kramers and Wannier found the exact location of the critical point for the Ising model on the square lattice.

Similar dualities establish relations between free energies of other statistical models.  For instance, in 3 dimensions the Ising model is dual to an Ising gauge model.

Intuitive idea

The 2-dimensional Ising model exists on a lattice, which is a collection of squares in a chessboard pattern.  With the finite lattice, the edges can be connected to form a torus.  In theories of this kind, one constructs an involutive transform.  For instance, Lars Onsager suggested that the Star-Triangle transformation could be used for the triangular lattice.  Now the dual of the discrete torus is itself.  Moreover, the dual of a highly disordered system (high temperature) is a well-ordered system (low temperature).  This is because the Fourier transform takes a high bandwidth signal (more standard deviation) to a low one (less standard deviation).  So one has essentially the same theory with an inverse temperature.  

When one raises the temperature in one theory, one lowers the temperature in the other.  If there is only one phase transition, it will be at the point at which they cross, at which the temperature is equal.  Because the 2D Ising model goes from a disordered state to an ordered state, there is a near one-to-one mapping between the disordered and ordered phases.

The theory has been generalized, and is now blended with many other ideas.  For instance, the square lattice is replaced by a circle, random lattice, nonhomogeneous torus, triangular lattice, labyrinth, lattices with twisted boundaries, chiral Potts model, and many others.

One of the consequences of Kramers–Wannier duality is an exact correspondence in the spectrum of excitations on each side of the critical point.   This was recently demonstrated via THz spectroscopy in 1D spin chains.

Derivation
Define these variables.
The low temperature expansion for (K*,L*) is

which by using the transformation

gives

where v = tanh K and  w = tanh L.  This yields a relation with the high-temperature expansion.  The relations can be written more symmetrically as

With the free energy per site in the thermodynamic limit

the Kramers–Wannier duality gives

In the isotropic case where K = L, if there is a critical point at K = Kc then there is another at K = K*c. Hence, in the case of there being a unique critical point, it would be located at K = K* = K*c, implying  sinh 2Kc = 1, yielding kTc = 2.2692J.

See also
 Ising model
 S-duality
 Z N model

References

External links
 
 

Statistical mechanics
Exactly solvable models
Lattice models